The theoretical foundations of evolutionary psychology are the general and specific scientific theories that explain the ultimate origins of psychological traits in terms of evolution. These theories originated with Charles Darwin's work, including his speculations about the evolutionary origins of social instincts in humans. Modern evolutionary psychology, however, is possible only because of advances in evolutionary theory in the 20th century.

Evolutionary psychologists say that natural selection has provided humans with many psychological adaptations, in much the same way that it generated humans' anatomical and physiological adaptations. As with adaptations in general, psychological adaptations are said to be specialized for the environment in which an organism evolved, the environment of evolutionary adaptedness, or EEA. Sexual selection provides organisms with adaptations related to mating. For male mammals, which have a relatively fast reproduction rate, sexual selection leads to adaptations that help them compete for females. For female mammals, with a relatively slow reproduction rate, sexual selection leads to choosiness, which helps females select higher quality mates. Charles Darwin described both natural selection and sexual selection, but he relied on group selection to explain the evolution of self-sacrificing behavior. Group selection is a weak explanation because in any group the less self-sacrificing animals will be more likely to survive and the group will become less self-sacrificing.

In 1964, William D. Hamilton proposed inclusive fitness theory, emphasizing a "gene's-eye" view of evolution. Hamilton noted that individuals can increase the replication of their genes into the next generation by helping close relatives with whom they share genes survive and reproduce. According to "Hamilton's rule", a self-sacrificing behavior can evolve if it helps close relatives so much that it more than compensates for the individual animal's sacrifice. Inclusive fitness theory resolved the issue of how "altruism" evolved. Other theories also help explain the evolution of altruistic behavior, including evolutionary game theory, tit-for-tat reciprocity, and generalized reciprocity. These theories not only help explain the development of altruistic behavior but also account for hostility toward cheaters (individuals that take advantage of others' altruism).

Several mid-level evolutionary theories inform evolutionary psychology. The R/K selection theory proposes that some species prosper by having many offspring while others follow the strategy of having fewer offspring but investing much more in each one. Humans follow the second strategy. Parental investment theory explains how parents invest more or less in individual offspring based on how successful those offspring are likely to be, and thus how much they might improve the parents' inclusive fitness. According to the Trivers–Willard hypothesis, parents in good conditions tend to invest more in sons (who are best able to take advantage of good conditions), while parents in poor conditions tend to invest more in daughters (who are best able to have successful offspring even in poor conditions). According to life history theory, animals evolve life histories to match their environments, determining details such as age at first reproduction and number of offspring. Dual inheritance theory posits that genes and human culture have interacted, with genes affecting the development of culture and culture, in turn, affecting human evolution on a genetic level (see also the Baldwin effect).

Critics of evolutionary psychology have sometimes challenged its theoretical underpinnings, saying that humans never developed powerful social instincts through natural selection and that the hypotheses of evolutionary psychologists are merely just-so-stories.

General evolutionary theory 

Evolutionary psychology primarily uses the theories of natural selection, sexual selection, and inclusive fitness to explain the evolution of psychological adaptations.

Evolutionary psychology is sometimes seen not simply as a subdiscipline of psychology but as a metatheoretical framework in which the entire field of psychology can be examined.

Natural selection 

Evolutionary psychologists consider Charles Darwin's theory of natural selection to be important to an understanding of psychology. Natural selection occurs because individual organisms who are genetically better suited to the current environment leave more descendants, and their genes spread through the population, thus explaining why organisms fit their environments so closely. This process is slow and cumulative, with new traits layered over older traits. The advantages created by natural selection are known as adaptations. Evolutionary psychologists say that animals, just as they evolve physical adaptations, evolve psychological adaptations.

Evolutionary psychologists emphasize that natural selection mostly generates specialized adaptations, which are more efficient than general adaptations. They point out that natural selection operates slowly, and that adaptations are sometimes out of date when the environment changes rapidly. In the case of humans, evolutionary psychologists say that much of human nature was shaped during the stone age and may not match the contemporary environment.

Sexual selection 

Sexual selection favors traits that provide mating advantages, such as the peacock's tail, even if these same traits are usually hindrances. Evolutionary psychologists point out that, unlike natural selection, sexual selection typically leads to the evolution of sex differences. Sex differences typically make reproduction faster for one sex and slower for the other, in which case mates are relatively scarce for the faster sex. Sexual selection favors traits that increase the number of mates for the fast sex and the quality of mates for the slow sex. For mammals, the female has the slower reproduction rate. Males typically evolve either traits to help them fight other males or traits to impress females. Females typically evolve greater abilities to discern the qualities of males, such as choosiness in mating.

Inclusive fitness 
Inclusive fitness theory, proposed by William D. Hamilton, emphasized a "gene's-eye" view of evolution.  Hamilton noted that what evolution ultimately selects are genes, not groups or species.  From this perspective, individuals can increase the replication of their genes into the next generation not only directly via reproduction, by also indirectly helping close relatives with whom they share genes survive and reproduce.   General evolutionary theory, in its modern form, is essentially inclusive fitness theory.

Inclusive fitness theory resolved the issue of how "altruism" evolved. The dominant, pre-Hamiltonian view was that altruism evolved via group selection: the notion that altruism evolved for the benefit of the group. The problem with this was that if one organism in a group incurred any fitness costs on itself for the benefit of others in the group, (i.e. acted "altruistically"), then that organism would reduce its own ability to survive and/or reproduce, therefore reducing its chances of passing on its altruistic traits.

Furthermore, the organism that benefited from that altruistic act and only acted on behalf of its own fitness would increase its own chance of survival and/or reproduction, thus increasing its chances of passing on its "selfish" traits.
Inclusive fitness resolved "the problem of altruism" by demonstrating that altruism can evolve via kin selection as expressed in Hamilton's rule:

In other words, altruism can evolve as long as the fitness cost of the altruistic act on the part of the actor is less than the degree of genetic relatedness of the recipient times the fitness benefit to that recipient.
This perspective reflects what is referred to as the gene-centered view of evolution and demonstrates that group selection is a very weak selective force.

Theoretical foundations

Middle-level evolutionary theories 
Middle-level evolutionary theories are consistent with general evolutionary theory, but focus on certain domains of functioning (Buss, 2011)  Specific evolutionary psychology hypotheses may be derivative from a mid-level theory (Buss, 2011). Three very important middle-level evolutionary theories were contributed by Robert Trivers as well as Robert MacArthur and E. O. Wilson

 The theory of parent–offspring conflict rests on the fact that even though a parent and his/her offspring are 50% genetically related, they are also 50% genetically different. All things being equal, a parent would want to allocate their resources equally amongst their offspring, while each offspring may want a little more for themselves. Furthermore, an offspring may want a little more resources from the parent than the parent is willing to give. In essence, parent-offspring conflict refers to a conflict of adaptive interests between parent and offspring. However, if all things are not equal, a parent may engage in discriminative investment towards one sex or the other, depending on the parent's condition.
The Trivers–Willard hypothesis, which proposes that parents will invest more in the sex that gives them the greatest reproductive payoff (grandchildren) with increasing or marginal investment. Females are the heavier parental investors in our species. Because of that, females have a better chance of reproducing at least once in comparison to males, but males in good condition have a better chance of producing high numbers of offspring than do females in good condition. Thus, according to the Trivers–Willard hypothesis, parents in good condition are predicted to favor investment in sons, and parents in poor condition are predicted to favor investment in daughters.
R/K selection theory, which, in ecology, relates to the selection of traits in organisms that allow success in particular environments. r-selected species, i.e., species in unstable or unpredictable environments, produce many offspring, each of which is unlikely to survive to adulthood. By contrast, K-selected species, i.e., species in stable or predictable environments, invest more heavily in fewer offspring, each of which has a better chance of surviving to adulthood.
Life history theory posits that the schedule and duration of key events in an organism's lifetime are shaped by natural selection to produce the largest possible number of surviving offspring.  For any given individual, available resources in any particular environment are finite. Time, effort, and energy used for one purpose diminishes the time, effort, and energy available for another. Examples of some major life history characteristics include: age at first reproductive event, reproductive lifespan and aging, and number and size of offspring. Variations in these characteristics reflect different allocations of an individual's resources (i.e., time, effort, and energy expenditure) to competing life functions. For example, attachment theory proposes that caregiver attentiveness in early childhood can determine later adult attachment style. Also, Jay Belsky and others have found evidence that if the father is absent from the home, girls reach first menstruation earlier and also have more short term sexual relationships as women.

References 

Evolution
Evolutionary psychology